Linby is a small village and civil parish in Nottinghamshire, England. The nearest town is Hucknall which is immediately to the south-west. The village grew up around the mills on the River Leen, from which Linby's name is derived.  Small streams known as Linby Docks run on both sides of the main street. The population of the civil parish at the 2011 census was 232.

History
In the Imperial Gazetteer of England and Wales (1870–72) John Marius Wilson described Linby:

The local parish church is dedicated to St. Michael and is a Grade II* listed building. Containing a number of features which date to the 13th century, the church has been extended several times, including restorations in the late 19th and early 20th centuries.

There are two crosses in the village. The "Top Cross", a Grade II listed structure, is dated to the 14th century and was restored in the late 19th century. The "Bottom Cross" is inscribed with the date 1663, and may have been dedicated to the restoration of King Charles II.

Linby won Nottinghamshire's "best kept village" award in 2013.

Linby Docks appeared on WW2 German Air Force maps  incorrectly thinking they were actually shipping docks.

Administration
From 1894 to 1974 the village was part of Basford Rural District.  It was then transferred to Gedling Borough. However, a small part of the parish had been transferred to Hucknall Urban District Council in 1935.

Linby is included in the Hidden Valleys area of Nottinghamshire.

Transport
The Linby Trail is a 2 km stretch of the National Cycle Route starting at the village and finishing at nearby Newstead Village.

Three railway lines once passed through Linby, with stations on two of them. The first was the Midland Railway (later part of the LMS) line from Nottingham to Mansfield and Worksop, closed to passengers on 12 October 1964 though partly retained as a freight route serving collieries at Annesley. In the 1990s this line was reopened to passengers in stages, the section through Linby in 1993, but Linby station did not reopen with it.

The second line was the Great Northern Railway (later part of the LNER) route serving many of the same places as the Midland. It closed to passengers on 14 September 1931 but remained in use for freight until 25 March 1968. The Linby station on this line had closed long before, on 1 July 1916.

The third line was the Great Central Railway (also later part of the LNER), the last main line ever built from the north of England to London, opened on 15 March 1899. The stretch through Linby (which crossed over both the other lines), closed completely on 5 September 1966, but there had never been a Linby station on this line.

Sports
The village has a football team, Linby Colliery F.C.

References

External links

Linby Village website

Villages in Nottinghamshire
Civil parishes in Nottinghamshire
Gedling
Pancakes